Jestem... is the first studio album by the Polish reggae band Bednarek. The album was released on November 28, 2012, by Lou & Rocked Boys.

The album landed at number 1 on Polish Albums Chart. On February 19, 2014 Jestem... was certified triple Platinum in Poland for selling 90,000 copies.

Track listing

Personnel

References

2012 albums
Polish-language albums
Kamil Bednarek albums